Chaetopappa imberbis,  called the awnless lazy daisy, or awnless leastdaisy, is a North American species of plants in the family Asteraceae. It has been found only in south-central Texas.

References

imberbis
Endemic flora of Texas
Plants described in 1880
Taxa named by Asa Gray
Flora without expected TNC conservation status